Gaetano (anglicized Cajetan) is an Italian masculine given name. It is also used as a surname. It is derived from the Latin Caietanus, meaning "from Caieta" (the modern Gaeta). The given name has been in use in Italy since medieval period, although it also remained in use as a byname indicating people from Gaeta, as in Thomas Cajetan or Gaetanus (1469–1534). The modern given name can be traced to Saint Gaetano dei Conti di Tiene (1480–1547) who was canonized in 1671. Other variants of the name exist in other Romance languages, the French form of the name is Gaëtan, Gaétan, the Portuguese form is Caetano, and the Spanish form is Cayetano. The feminine form is Gaetana (also Caetana and Cayetana).

People with the given name Gaetano

Clergy and religious figures
 Pope Nicholas III (Giovanni Gaetano Orsini), Pope from 1277–1280
 Thomas Cajetan (Tomasso de Vio Cardinal Cajetan), (1469 – 1534), Italian philosopher, theologian, cardinal, and the Master of the Order of Preachers
 Gaetano dei Conti di Tiene (Saint Cajetan, 1480–1547), Catholic saint
 Gaetano Bedini (1806–1864), Italian ecclesiastical, Cardinal and diplomat of the Catholic Church
 Gaetano Pace Forno (1809–1874), Maltese bishop of the Roman Catholic Church
 Gaetano Bisleti (1856–1937), Cardinal of the Roman Catholic Church
 Gaetano Catanoso (1879–1963), Italian parish priest
 Gaetano Cicognani (1881–1962), Italian prelate of the Roman Catholic Church
 Gaetano Alibrandi (1914–2003), archbishop of the Roman Catholic Church

Scholars and academics
 Gaetano da Thiene (philosopher) (1387–1465) 
 Gaetano Filangieri (1753–1788), Italian jurist and philosopher
 Gaetano Sanseverino (1811–1865), Italian philosopher and theologian
 Gaetano De Sanctis (1870–1957), historian and senator
 Gaetano Arturo Crocco (1877-1968), space scientist
 Gaetano Kanizsa (1913–1993), Italian psychologist and perception scientist
 Gaetano Cozzi (1922–2001), Italian historian
 Gaetano Borriello (1958–2015), Italian-American computer scientist

The arts
 Gaetano Berenstadt (1687–1734), Italian alto castrato
 Gaetano Braga (1829–1907), Italian composer and cellist
 Gaetano Brunetti (1744–1798), prolific Italian composer
 Gaetano Castelli (born 1938), Italian painter and set designer
 Gaetano Chiaveri (c. 1689–1770), Italian architect
 Gaetano Donizetti (1797–1848), Italian opera composer
 Gaetano Gandolfi (1734–1802), Bolognese painter
 Gaetano Greco (circa 1657–1728), Italian Baroque composer
 Gaetano Guadagni (1729–1792), Italian mezzo-soprano castrato singer
 Gaetano Lapis (1704–1776), Italian painter
 Gaetano "Guy" Lombardo (1902–1977), Canadian bandleader
 Gaetano Martoriello (circa 1680–1733), Italian painter
 Gaetano Merola (1881–1953), Italian conductor
 Gaetano Pesce (born 1939), Italian architect and designer
 Gaetano Pollastri (1886–1960), professional violinist
 Gaetano Previati, artist
 Gaetano Pugnani (1731–1798), Italian violinist
 Gaetano Sabatini (1703–1734), Italian draftsman and painter
 Gaetano Sgarabotto (1878–1959), Italian violinmaker
 Gaetano Trentanove (1858–1937), Italian-American sculptor
 Gaetano Zompini (1700–1778), Italian printmaker and engraver
 Gaetano John "Gaten" Matarazzo (born 2002), American actor of Italian descent

Writers and journalists
 Gaetano Arfé (1925–2007), Italian politician, historian, and journalist
 Gaetano Milanesi (1813–1895), Italian scholar and writer
 Gaetano Moroni (1802–1883), Italian writer
 Gaetano Mosca (1858–1941), Italian political scientist, journalist and public servant
 Gaetano Polidori (1764–1853), Italian writer and scholar
 Gaetano Salvemini (1873–1957), Italian anti-fascist politician, historian and writer

Crime figures
 Gaetano Badalamenti (1923–2004), powerful member of the Sicilian Mafia
 Gaetano Gianolla (20th century), Italian-American mobster
 Gaetano Lococo (20th century), Italian-American mobster
 Gaetano Reina (1889–1930), Sicilian-American mobster

Sports
 Gaetano Berardi (born 1988), Swiss football player
 Gaetano Belloni (1892–1980), Italian road racing cyclist
 Gaétan Boucher (born 1958), Canadian speed skater
 Gaetano Caridi (born 1980), Italian football player
 Gaetano D'Agostino (born 1982), Italian football player
 Gaetano De Rosa (born 1973), Italian football player
 Gaetano Fontana (born 1970), Italian football player
 Gaetano Giallanza (born 1974), Swiss football player
 Gaetano Orlando (born 1962), Italian-Canadian ice hockey player
 Gaetano Scirea (1953–1989), Italian football player
 Gaetano Starrabba (born 1932), Italian racing driver
 Gaetano Vasari (born 1970), Italian football player
 Gaetano Vastola (born 1978), Italian football player

Other
 Gaetano Arturo Crocco (1877–1968), founder of the Italian Rocket Society
 Gaetano Bresci (1869–1901), Italian-American anarchist
 Francesco Gaetano Caltagirone (born 1943), Italian businessman
 Gaetano Casati (1838–1902), Italian explorer of Africa
 Gaetano Gagliano (1917–2016), Canadian businessman
 Gaetano Manfredi (born 1964), Italian politician
 Gaetano Martino (1900–1967), Italian politician  
 Gaetano Polverelli (1886–1960), Italian journalist and politician 
 Gaetano Saya (born 1956), far right Italian politician
 Gaetano Tanti (20th century), Maltese trade unionist
 Gaetano John "Gaten" Matarazzo (born 2002), American actor

People with the given name Gaetana
 Maria Gaetana Agnesi, mathematician
 Giuseppa Gaetana Ferreri, singer

People with the surname Gaetano
 Gianluca Gaetano (born 2000), Italian professional footballer 
 Giuseppe de Gaetano (born 1966), Italian race walker 
 Juan Gaetano (16th century), Spanish sailor
 Nick Gaetano (21st century), prolific illustrator
 Paul DiGaetano (born 1953), American politician
 Rino Gaetano (1950–1981), Italian singer-songwriter

See also
Cajetan
Caetano

Italian masculine given names